Harold Moukoudi (born 27 November 1997) is a professional footballer who plays as a centre-back for Super League Greece club AEK Athens. Born in France, he represents Cameroon at international level.

Club career

AEK Athens
On 17 August 2022, following his decision to leave Saint-Étienne, Moukoudi travelled to Athens to discuss a possible move to AEK. One day later, the Greek club officially announced the signing of Moukoudi on a free transfer, until the summer of 2026.

International career
Born in France, Moukoudi is of Cameroonian descent. He is a former youth international for France. He debuted for the senior Cameroon national team in a 0–0 friendly tie with Tunisia on 12 October 2019.

Career statistics

Honours 
Saint-Étienne

 Coupe de France runner-up: 2019–20

Cameroon
 Africa Cup of Nations third place: 2021

References

External links
 
 
 
 

1997 births
Living people
Sportspeople from Bondy
Cameroonian footballers
Cameroon international footballers
French footballers
France youth international footballers
French sportspeople of Cameroonian descent
Black French sportspeople
Citizens of Cameroon through descent
Association football defenders
US Chantilly players
Le Havre AC players
AS Saint-Étienne players
Middlesbrough F.C. players
AEK Athens F.C. players
Championnat National 3 players
Championnat National 2 players
Ligue 2 players
Ligue 1 players
English Football League players
2021 Africa Cup of Nations players
Footballers from Seine-Saint-Denis
French expatriate footballers
Cameroonian expatriate footballers
Expatriate footballers in England
French expatriate sportspeople in England
Cameroonian expatriate sportspeople in England
Expatriate footballers in Greece
French expatriate sportspeople in Greece
Cameroonian expatriate sportspeople in Greece